Nathalie Dechy and Mara Santangelo were the defending champions, but Dechy retired from tennis before being able to defend the title, and Santangelo chose not to participate this year.

In the final, Cara Black and Liezel Huber defeated Natalie Grandin and Laura Granville, 7–6(4), 6–2.

Seeds

Draw

Draw

WTA Auckland Open
2010 WTA Tour

it:ASB Classic 2010 - Singolare